Frances Miller Mumaugh (July 11, 1860 – 1933) was an American still-life painter. She exhibited an oil, A Dreamer, at the World's Congress of Representative Women of the World's Columbian Exposition in Chicago, 1893; and was also an exhibitor at the Louisiana Purchase Exposition, 1904.

Early years and education
Frances Miller was born in Newark, New York, July 11, 1860. She was a descendant of an old Lutheran family from Saxony. Her childhood was passed in the Genesee Valley. When a mere child, her artistic faculty attracted the attention of her teachers. She was educated in the public schools, but without instruction in her special line, in which she continued to show development.

Career
In 1879, she married John E. Mumaugh, of Omaha, Nebraska, where they afterward resided. She was soon identified with western art and artists.
 Broad in her ideas, she was not a follower of any particular school, and sought for herself nature's inspirations. Thrown on her own resources in 1885, with a two-year-old daughter to care  for, worked diligently to be a recognized western artists. With the exception of a course of study in water-color under Jules Guérin, of Chicago, a summer course in oil with Dwight Frederick Boyden, of Paris, as well as a course with William Merritt Chase, her progress was due almost entirely to her own efforts. She delighted in landscapes, in which line she was always successful. She also designed holiday cards and gift tags for large firms, finding a big demand for them.

Mumaugh kept a studio in Omaha's Paxton block. As a teacher, her classes were always full. She conducted the art department in Long Pine Chautauqua for four years, and one season in Fremont, Nebraska. She served on the board of directors of the Western Art Association since its organization, in 1888.

Mumaugh died in 1933.

Gallery
Mumaugh's Christmas card designs (1920)

Mumaugh's Christmas gift tag designs (1920)

Notes

References

Attribution

Bibliography
 
 
 

1860 births
1933 deaths
People from Newark, New York
American still life painters
American graphic designers
19th-century American painters
20th-century American painters
American women painters
20th-century American women artists
19th-century American women artists
Women graphic designers
Wikipedia articles incorporating text from A Woman of the Century